The 1952 Paris–Tours was the 46th edition of the Paris–Tours cycle race and was held on 5 October 1952. The race started in Paris and finished in Tours. The race was won by Raymond Guegan.

General classification

References

1952 in French sport
1952
1952 Challenge Desgrange-Colombo
October 1952 sports events in Europe